Deathtrap is a 1982 American black comedy mystery film based on the 1978 play of the same name by Ira Levin. It was directed by Sidney Lumet from a screenplay by Levin and Jay Presson Allen, and stars Michael Caine, Dyan Cannon and Christopher Reeve. Critics gave the film mostly favorable reviews, while noting its plot similarities to Caine's 1972 film Sleuth.

Plot
Famed playwright Sidney Bruhl debuts the latest in a series of Broadway flops and returns to his opulent Long Island home and his wife Myra. Although their financial situation is not dire, Sidney is starving for a hit. He receives a manuscript of a play called Deathtrap, written by one of his students, Clifford Anderson, that he considers to be near-perfection. Clifford recently attended one of Sidney's writing workshops and is now asking for input on his play. Sidney tells Myra that the best idea he has had lately is to murder Clifford and produce the play as his own. Myra realizes that's he's not just talking idly.

Sidney invites Clifford to their secluded home, decorated with weapons from his plays, to discuss Clifford's play. Clifford arrives by train. Over the course of an evening, Myra tries desperately to convince Sidney to work with Clifford as equal partners but to no avail. Sidney then attacks Clifford and strangles him with a chain. Sidney removes the body but still has to convince Myra to conspire with him. She reveals nothing when they receive an unexpected visit from the psychic Helga Ten Dorp, a minor celebrity staying with the Bruhls' neighbors. Helga senses pain and death in the house. Before she leaves, she warns Sidney about a man in boots who will attack him.

As Myra prepares for bed, she begins to come to terms with what Sidney has done. She heads downstairs for a drink but a sound spooks her and she flees back upstairs, suspecting an intruder. Sidney takes her back downstairs to prove that all is well and they return to the bedroom. The calm is broken when Clifford bursts through the bedroom window and beats Sidney with a log. Clifford chases Myra through the house until her weak heart gives out and she collapses and dies.

Sidney calmly descends the stairs, uninjured, and joins Clifford. They exchange a few words about what to do with Myra's body, then exchange a passionate kiss. The previous few hours are revealed to have been an elaborate ruse to kill Myra. Clifford moves in with Sidney and the two work together at a partner's desk. Sidney suffers from writer's block but Clifford busily types page after page of a new play that he suspiciously keeps under lock and key. While Clifford is out grocery shopping, Sidney tries to break into the drawer but fails to before Clifford returns home. He waits for Clifford to retrieve his play, then switches Clifford's manuscript with a fake.

Sidney is horrified to read that Clifford is using the true story of Myra's murder as the basis of a new play called Deathtrap. He angrily confronts Clifford, who boasts about the play's potential and insists he will write it with or without Sidney's approval. Clifford offers to share the credit with Sidney, who comes to believe that Clifford is a sociopath. Sidney plays along with the collaboration on Deathtrap while he plots a solution. A few days later, Helga stops by, ostensibly for candles in anticipation of a predicted thunderstorm. Almost immediately after meeting Clifford, she warns Sidney that Clifford is the man in boots.

Sidney asks Clifford to arm himself with an axe to demonstrate a bit of stage business, then produces a gun. He intends to shoot Clifford, claim it was in self-defense and dispose of the Deathtrap manuscript. But Sidney finds his gun to be empty. Clifford had anticipated some such scheme from him and has loaded the bullets into a different gun. Clifford now intends to use Sidney's attempted betrayal-and-axe scheme in the play. He secures Sidney to a chair with manacles and tells him he is going to pack up and leave. He warns Sidney to not try to stop the production of the play.

However, Clifford is unaware the manacles are trick shackles, once the property of Harry Houdini. Sidney easily releases himself, grabs a crossbow and incapacitates Clifford with a single shot. Before Sidney can dispose of the body, the storm hits with full force and the house suffers a blackout. A flash of lightning illuminates the living room and a fleeting figure scurries through. It is Helga, thinking Sidney is in danger and coming to help.

She realizes that Sidney actually poses the threat and grabs a gun while Sidney finds a knife. Clifford regains consciousness and trips Helga. The gun goes flying and a struggle for it ensues. Clifford stumbles to his feet, grabs the axe and swings it at Sidney. In that moment, the scene transitions to a stage version of itself, with actors before a full house. The on-stage struggle culminates with "Clifford" stabbing "Sidney" and both dying, leaving "Helga" victorious. The opening night audience erupts in thunderous applause, and at the back of the theatre stands an exultant Helga Ten Dorp, now the author of a hit Broadway play called Deathtrap.

Cast 
 Michael Caine as Sidney Bruhl
 Christopher Reeve as Clifford Anderson
 Dyan Cannon as Myra Bruhl
 Irene Worth as Helga Ten Dorp
 Henry Jones as Porter Milgrim
 Joe Silver as Seymour Starger

Real-life film and theatre critics Stewart Klein, Jeffrey Lyons and Joel Siegel have cameo appearances as themselves.

Reception 
Deathtrap has a positive rating of 72% at Rotten Tomatoes based on 18 reviews, with an average rating of 6.8/10. Critic Roger Ebert gave it three stars, calling it "a comic study of ancient and honorable human defects, including greed, envy, lust, pride, avarice, sloth, and falsehood." Ebert, along with Janet Maslin, and Gary Arnold of The Washington Post noted the similarities to Caine's 1972 film Sleuth, and similarities have subsequently been noted by film historians.

Cannon was nominated for a Golden Raspberry Award for Worst Supporting Actress for her performance.

The kissing scene between Sidney and Clifford is not in the original play (although they are revealed to be lovers). In his book The Celluloid Closet, gay film historian Vito Russo reports that Reeve said that the kiss was booed by preview audiences in Denver, Colorado, and estimated that a Time magazine report of the kiss spoiled a key plot element and cost the film $10 million in ticket sales.  (The film earned more than $19 million at the box office.) In his book Murder Most Queer (2014),  Jordan Schildcrout describes attending a screening at which an audience member screamed, "Say it ain't so, Superman!" at the moment of the Caine–Reeve kiss.

Home video release
Deathtrap was released on Region 1 DVD on July 27, 1999. It was re-released on November 8, 2003, as half of a two-pack with the Henry Winkler/Michael Keaton buddy film Night Shift. Warner Home Video released Deathtrap on Blu-ray Disc on November 20, 2012, as part of the Warner Archive Collection.

References

External links
 
 
 
 
 
Deathtrap on TCM

1980s black comedy films
1982 LGBT-related films
1980s comedy mystery films
1980s comedy thriller films
1980s mystery thriller films
1982 films
American black comedy films
American comedy mystery films
American comedy thriller films
American LGBT-related films
American mystery thriller films
Comedy mystery films
1980s English-language films
Films about theatre
Films about writers
Gay-related films
American films based on plays
Films based on works by Ira Levin
Films directed by Sidney Lumet
Films scored by Johnny Mandel
Films set in Long Island
Films shot in New York (state)
Self-reflexive films
Warner Bros. films
1982 comedy films
1980s American films